Inveruglas Isle (Scottish Gaelic: "Innis Inbhir Dhughlais") is a small uninhabited island within Loch Lomond, and lies off the shore at Inveruglas opposite Inversnaid at the north end of the loch. It is opposite the Loch Sloy powerstation.

The name Inbhir Dhu(bh)ghlais means "mouth of the black stream"; Inveruglas Isle is therefore, quite literally, the island at the mouth of the black stream.

The island houses the ruins of a castle which was once home to the chiefs of the Clan MacFarlane, destroyed in the seventeenth century by Oliver Cromwell's Roundhead troops.

References

External links
Inveruglas Isle, The Islands of Loch Lomond
Stories and Facts about the Islands of Loch Lomond, In Callander Website

Islands of Loch Lomond
Uninhabited islands of Argyll and Bute